Huỳnh Tấn Sinh (born 6 April 1998) is a Vietnamese footballer who plays as a centre-back for V.League 1 club Công An Hà Nội

International goals

Vietnam U23

Achievements
QNK Quảng Nam 
V.League 1: 2017
Hà Nội
V.League 1: 2022
Vietnamese National Cup: 2022
Vietnam U23
Southeast Asian Games: 2019

References

1998 births
Living people
Vietnamese footballers
Association football central defenders
V.League 1 players
Quang Nam FC players
People from Quảng Nam province
Competitors at the 2019 Southeast Asian Games
Southeast Asian Games medalists in football
Southeast Asian Games gold medalists for Vietnam